Oxford Entrepreneurs is an Oxford-based British student society which was founded in 2002 to encourage entrepreneurship among students at University of Oxford. It is the largest entrepreneurship society in Europe. Its alumni have founded some of Britain's most successful startups, including Monzo, Onfido, Quid, and PlinkArt (acquired by Google).

History 

Oxford Entrepreneurs was initiated in 2002 by Fiona Reid, former executive director of the University of Oxford's Centre for Entrepreneurship and Innovation (OxCEI). It supports entrepreneurs at University of Oxford by running events and assisting with the development of ideas.

Companies founded by its members 

Companies founded by Oxford Entrepreneurs alumni include Auctomatic (founded by Kulveer Taggar and Harjeet Taggar, acquired by Live Current Media), Quid (founded by Bob Goodson), GroupSpaces (founded by David Langer and Andy Young), Oxford BioLabs (founded by Thomas Whitfield), Onfido (founded by Husayn Kassai and Eamon Jubbawy).

References

Clubs and societies of the University of Oxford
Entrepreneurship organizations
2002 establishments in England